Albert Valéry Dufour (February 5, 1927 – July 27, 2000), known as Val Dufour, was an American actor. Born in New Orleans, Louisiana, Dufour's parents were of Parisian French descent.

Dufour first appeared on episodic television in 1952, and amassed appearances on over a dozen series. He was best known for his role as John Wyatt on the soap opera Search for Tomorrow, which he played from 1972 to 1979. Dufour won a Daytime Emmy Award for his performance in 1977. Before his debut on Search for Tomorrow, Dufour was also noted for his role as Walter Curtin on Another World from 1967 to 1972 and for his role of Andre Lazar on The Edge of Night.

Dufour died in Manhattan in 2000 of cancer.

Filmography

References

1927 births
2000 deaths
Deaths from cancer in New York (state)
20th-century American male actors
American male soap opera actors
Daytime Emmy Award winners
Daytime Emmy Award for Outstanding Lead Actor in a Drama Series winners
Male actors from New Orleans
Male actors from Louisiana